The New Territories Heung Yee Kuk Yuen Long District Secondary School (abbreviated as NTHYKYLDSS) is a Hong Kong secondary school located in Yuen Long, New Territories. Its motto is in Chinese "務本力學", meaning "conscientiousness and diligence". The official medium of instruction is English.

History 
The foundation-laying ceremony of the school was held in 1966. The school opened in 1967, using the campus of the Yuen Long Public Secondary School until 1968, when the construction was completed. The opening ceremony was then held in 1969, with Sir David Trench as the officiator. The school council was established on the same year, with Ho Chuen Yiu as the chairman. In 1970, Tang Yuek Fan took over as the chairman of the school.

In 1983, Lau Wong-fat took over as the chairman of the school council. The parent-teacher association was also founded in 1985. The alumni association was founded in 1990.

The education department planned to expand the school campus. The construction started in 1996 and was finished in 1998. In 1999, the use of information technology was adapted.

References

1967 establishments in Hong Kong
Yuen Long
Educational institutions established in 1967
Secondary schools in Hong Kong